John Isner was the two-time defending champion, and he won the title for the third straight year, defeating Marcos Baghdatis in the final, 6–3, 6–3.

Seeds
The top four seeds receive a bye into the second round.

Draw

Finals

Top half

Bottom half

Qualifying

Seeds

Qualifiers

Qualifying draw

First qualifier

Second qualifier

Third qualifier

Fourth qualifier

References
Main draw
Qualifying draw

Atlanta Open - Singles
2015 ATP World Tour
2015 Singles
Atlanta